Martin Shayne "Marty" Minuk is a defence lawyer from Winnipeg, Manitoba, Canada. He received his law degree from the University of Manitoba in 1978. Since 2005, he has been a partner at the law firm Aikins, MacAulay, and Thorvaldson.

Minuk is notable for being appointed the special prosecutor in the death of Crystal Taman. He approved a controversial plea bargain in that case, which eventually resulted in the Taman Inquiry.

References

Lawyers in Manitoba
University of Manitoba alumni
Living people
Robson Hall alumni
Year of birth missing (living people)